The Town of Adrian is located in Monroe County, Wisconsin, United States. The population was 682 at the 2000 Census. The unincorporated communities of Jacksonville and Scotts Junction are located in the town.

Geography
According to the United States Census Bureau, the town has a total area of 35.3 square miles (91.3 km2), of which, 35.3 square miles (91.3 km2) of it is land and 0.03% is water.

Demographics
As of the census of 2000, there were 682 people, 231 households, and 188 families residing in the town. The population density was 19.3 people per square mile (7.5/km2). There were 248 housing units at an average density of 7.0 per square mile (2.7/km2). The racial makeup of the town was 99.41% White, 0.15% African American, 0.15% Native American, and 0.29% from two or more races. Hispanic or Latino of any race were 0.15% of the population.

There were 231 households, out of which 46.3% had children under the age of 18 living with them, 71.4% were married couples living together, 5.2% had a female householder with no husband present, and 18.6% were non-families. 15.6% of all households were made up of individuals, and 5.6% had someone living alone who was 65 years of age or older. The average household size was 2.95 and the average family size was 3.32.

In the town, the population was spread out, with 31.7% under the age of 18, 7.0% from 18 to 24, 31.4% from 25 to 44, 22.4% from 45 to 64, and 7.5% who were 65 years of age or older. The median age was 36 years. For every 100 females, there were 111.8 males. For every 100 females age 18 and over, there were 110.9 males.

The median income for a household in the town was $45,875, and the median income for a family was $51,786. Males had a median income of $31,583 versus $25,673 for females. The per capita income for the town was $19,791. About 1.0% of families and 2.1% of the population were below the poverty line, including none of those under age 18 and 13.4% of those age 65 or over.

References

Towns in Monroe County, Wisconsin
Towns in Wisconsin